Andrew Edward Masich (born February 7, 1955) is the President and CEO of the Senator John Heinz History Center, a Smithsonian affiliate, Pittsburgh's oldest cultural institution, and Pennsylvania's largest history museum. The Heinz History Center includes the Western Pennsylvania Sports Museum, Fort Pitt Museum, and Meadowcroft Rockshelter and Historic Village. Masich was previously Chairman of the Pennsylvania Historical and Museum Commission (2011-2016). A leader in the field of public history, he is known internationally for his lively history presentations; his Emmy-winning historical documentaries; and his award-winning books on American Indians, the Civil War, and sports history.

Museums 

Masich oversees the operation of the 350,000-square-foot Senator John Heinz History Center, located in the 1898 Chautauqua Lake Ice Company warehouse in downtown Pittsburgh. In 1999, he forged a strategic partnership with the Smithsonian Institution. Smithsonian Secretary Lawrence Small declared the Heinz History Center “the Smithsonian's home in Pittsburgh,” and Smithsonian collections are now on exhibit at all times. Masich has forged strategic partnerships with organizations such as the Smithsonian Institution, the Commonwealth of Pennsylvania, Allegheny Conference for Community Development, Boy Scouts of America, VisitPittsburgh, and the American Association for State and Local History. Under Masich's leadership, the History Center merged with other regional museums and historical organizations, including the Meadowcroft Museum, The Westinghouse Museum, and the Pittsburgh Police Historical Association. The Fort Pitt Museum is operated according to a long-term agreement with the Pennsylvania Historical and Museum Commission. Through its affiliates Program, the History Center partners with and offers assistance to 125 additional museums and historical societies in Western Pennsylvania.

Teaching 

Masich is an adjunct history faculty member at Carnegie Mellon University teaching American History and Public History courses. His lively lectures on subjects ranging from American Indians to American innovation have entertained and educated audiences from coast to coast. A recognized authority on the preservation and creative interpretation of history, he has been a faculty member of the prestigious Seminar for Historical Administration, an American Association for State and Local History (AASLH) Council member, an American Alliance of Museums (AAM) Accreditation Commissioner (2004-2015), and serves on the National Council for Public History's (NCPH) Editorial Board for The Public Historian. His popular presentations include “Unknown Stories of the Civil War,” “History of Innovation,” “Young George Washington,” and, for professional museum audiences, “Lighten Up!” (humor therapy for directors and other humor impaired museum professionals) and “History Museum Vampires: How to Suck the Life Out of Your Museum.”

Television, Radio, and Internet Education Programs 

Masich makes regular television appearances on KDKA (CBS), offering bi-weekly “Pittsburgh History Today” segments and co-hosting the popular “Pittsburgh's Hidden Treasures” antiques appraisal program. Working with producer David Solomon at WQED (PBS), he has won Emmys for historical documentaries. Masich is a regular contributor to Pittsburgh Public Radio, WESA, and his History Minute programs can be heard daily on Pittsburgh's KQV radio. He also serves as expert historian and story teller for a variety of national media outlets and programs hosted by the History Channel, Discovery Channel, and the Smithsonian Channel. He is featured in the History Center's popular virtual exhibit tours and videos.

Early life and career

Born February 7, 1955 in Yonkers, New York, Masich's family moved to Tucson, Arizona in 1971. He graduated from Canyon del Oro High School in 1973 and went on to earn a BA as a double major in History and Anthropology in 1977 and an MA in History from the University of Arizona in 1984. He served as director of the Arizona Historical Society's Rio Colorado Division in Yuma from 1978 to 1985, then as the director of the Central Arizona Division in Phoenix from 1985 to 1990. From 1990 to 1998 he served as vice president of the Colorado Historical Society (now History Colorado), the state's official history agency. Masich also holds a PhD in history from Carnegie Mellon University.

Books by Andrew E. Masich 
 Cheyenne Dog Soldiers: A Ledgerbook History of Coups and Combat, with David F. Halaas, et al., University Press of Colorado (1997).
 Halfbreed: The Remarkable True Story of George Bent: Caught Between the Worlds of the Indian and the White Man, with David F. Halaas, DaCapo Press (2004). 
 Civil War in Arizona: The Story of the California Volunteers, 1861-65, University of Oklahoma Press (2006).  
 Dan Rooney: My 75 Years with the Pittsburgh Steelers and the NFL, with David F. Halaas and Dan Rooney, DaCapo Press (2007).
 Civil War in the Southwest Borderlands, 1861-1867, University of Oklahoma Press (2017).

References

20th-century American businesspeople
Businesspeople from Pennsylvania
Carnegie Mellon University faculty
1955 births
Living people